
The Orbis Cascade Alliance is a library consortium serving academic libraries in the Northwestern United States. The consortium was formed through the 2003 merger of two previous consortia, Orbis and Cascade, which incorporated libraries in Oregon and Washington, respectively. The Alliance consists of 37 governing members, consisting of colleges and universities in Oregon and Washington, plus the University of Idaho. The Alliance serves many types of libraries in a broader area that includes Oregon, Washington, Idaho, Montana, Alaska and Hawaii.

Members

 Central Oregon Community College
 Central Washington University
 Chemeketa Community College
Clackamas Community College
 Clark College
 Eastern Oregon University
 Eastern Washington University
 George Fox University
 Lane Community College
 Lewis & Clark College
 Linfield College
 Mt. Hood Community College
 Oregon Health & Science University
 Oregon Institute of Technology
 Oregon State University
 Pacific University
 Portland Community College
 Portland State University
 Reed College
 Saint Martin's University
 Seattle Pacific University
 Seattle University
 Southern Oregon University
 The Evergreen State College
 University of Idaho
 University of Oregon
 University of Portland
 University of Puget Sound
 University of Washington
 Walla Walla University
 Warner Pacific College
 Washington State University
 Western Oregon University
 Western Washington University
 Whitman College
Whitworth University
 Willamette University

See also
 Archives West
 Case & Draper

References

External links
 Orbis Cascade Alliance website

2003 establishments in Oregon
2003 establishments in Washington (state)
Consortia in the United States
Education in Oregon
Education in Washington (state)
Organizations established in 2003
Library consortia in Oregon
Library consortia in Washington (state)
Library consortia in Idaho
Library consortia in Montana
Library consortia in Hawaii
Library consortia in Alaska
Library consortia with members in multiple states